Lacinutrix copepodicola is a bacterium from the genus of Lacinutrix.

References 

Flavobacteria
Bacteria described in 2005